I Am Trash is a 2014 South Korean drama film written and directed by South Korean indie provocateur Lee Sang-woo. The third and final instalment of Lee's thematic "bad family" trilogy comprising Mother Is a Whore (2011) and Father Is a Dog (2012), it follows three grown up brothers reuniting with their pedophile father after his release from prison. It made its world premiere in the Fantastic Features section at the 10th Fantastic Fest in 2014.

Synopsis
After their father (Kwan Bum-tack) was sent off to prison for sexually assaulting an underaged girl, Sang-woo (Lee Sang-woo) and his two brothers Sang-tae (Yang Myoung-hoen) and Sang-goo (Park Hyung-bin) struggle to live a normal life. Now, the three emotionally damaged brothers must deal with the aftermath of their father returning home after his release from prison.

Cast
 Kwan Bum-tack as Father
 Lee Sang-woo as Sang-woo
 Yang Myoung-hoen as Sang-tae 
 Park Hyung-bin as Sang-goo
 Jo Yong-seok
 Yoo So-hyeon

Reception

References

External links
 
 

2014 films
South Korean drama films
2010s Korean-language films
Films directed by Lee Sang-woo
2010s South Korean films